Charles Ernest Weatherburn (18 June 1884 – 18 October 1974) was an Australian-born mathematician.

Weatherburn graduated from the University of Sydney an MA in 1906. After being awarded a scholarship he studied at Trinity College, Cambridge sitting the Mathematical Tripos examinations in 1908. Weatherburn was awarded a First Class degree. On his return to Australia, Weatherburn taught at Ormond College of the University of Melbourne.

In 1923 was appointed chair of mathematics in Canterbury College, University of New Zealand. He returned to Australia in 1929 as chair of mathematics at the University of Western Australia, a post he held until he retired in 1950.

He died in Perth, Australia in 1974.

Selected works 
 A first course in mathematical statistics
 Differential geometry of three dimensions
 An introduction to Riemannian geometry and the tensor calculus
 Elementary vector analysis : With application to geometry and mechanics, London (1921); PDF/DjVu Copy at the Internet Archive.
 Advanced vector analysis

References

Academic staff of the University of Western Australia
Academic staff of the University of Melbourne
Academic staff of the University of Canterbury
University of Sydney alumni
Alumni of Trinity College, Cambridge
Scientists from Sydney
1884 births
1974 deaths
20th-century New Zealand mathematicians
20th-century Australian mathematicians